Stacy Westfall (born September 26, 1974) is a professional horse trainer who specializes in reining. She was the first woman to compete in and win the Road to the Horse competition.  In 2006 she won the All American Quarter Horse Congress Freestyle Reining competition on the black mare, Whizards Baby Doll, riding both bridleless and bareback. The video of this ride went viral on the internet and brought Westfall to the attention of the non-horse world.

Early life and career
Westfall grew up in South China, Maine, was taught to ride by her mother and got her first pony, named Midnight Misty, at the age of six. Her first full-sized horse was a mare named "Bay", given to her by her father as a reward for good grades in school. She used Bay for barrel racing. Her parents, Sherri and Biff Gliddon, were not horse professionals, although Sherri had a lifelong interest in horses, and until Westfall went to college, Sherri was her only instructor. Westfall went to college at the University of Findlay in Ohio, where she majored in equestrian studies. Her instructors included Steve Brown and Clark Bradley.  She went on to work for the well-known reining trainers, Mike Flarida and Dan Huss. At the root of her technique is the principle to "think-like-a-horse”.

In 1994, Westfall met her future husband, Jesse Westfall, at the Quarter Horse Congress. They married in 1997. Jesse Westfall is also a reining trainer and a judge for the National Reining Horse Association (NRHA). The couple settled in Mount Gilead, Ohio, have three sons and run a horse training facility. Westfall gives clinics, trains horses, and competes in reining.

Westfall did not originally compete without a bridle on her horses until one time when she accidentally dropped a rein while in a traditional reining competition on her mare, Can Can Lena, a move that normally results in disqualification, but which also gave her the idea to test herself with a new challenge. She then began to perform bridleless in freestyle reining, a form of reining competition where exhibitors design their own routines and perform to music. Costumes are allowed and there are fewer rules for equipment. In 2003 she won the National Reining Horse Association Freestyle reining competition riding with no bridle, and in 2006, on the black American Quarter Horse, Whizards Baby Doll, aka “Roxy," she won twice while riding bridleless and bareback.

Career milestones
 1997 Graduate of University of Findlay
 2003 NRHA Futurity Freestyle Champion (Bridleless) 
 2005 All American Quarter Horse Congress Freestyle Futurity Champion
 2005 NRHA Futurity Freestyle Champion
 2006 Road to the Horse Winner  
 2006 All American Quarter Horse Congress Freestyle Champion 
 2006 Named to The University of Findlay’s Western Equestrian Wall of Fame
 2006 The University of Findlay’s Western Equestrian Wall of Fame certificate was sent to her

Mainstream media
Stacy’s best-known bridleless freestyle ride was in 2006 when she and “Roxy” were named All American Quarter Horse Congress freestyle reining champions. She performed to the song “Live Like You Were Dying” by Tim McGraw and dedicated the ride to her father, who had died 24 days before her performance. When a video of that ride was posted on her website in February 2008 it became very popular and came to the attention of television talk show host Ellen DeGeneres, who interviewed Westfall on her program on March 14, 2008, bringing both Westfall and Roxy to the studio.  However, by 2011, the video of Westfall's performance had "gone viral" across the internet containing a claim that she was in her 20s, deaf, and mute, none of which was accurate.

References

External links 
 

Living people
Western horse trainers
People from Mount Gilead, Ohio
Cowgirl Hall of Fame inductees
1974 births